Ka Gyi Yay Ka is a 1959 Burmese black-and-white drama film, directed by Tha Du starring Htun Wai, Myat Mon and Khin Nyunt.

Cast
Htun Wai
Myat Mon
Khin Nyunt

Awards

References

1959 films
1950s Burmese-language films
Films shot in Myanmar
Burmese black-and-white films
1959 drama films
Burmese drama films